A bema is a ceremonial platform set up in an assembly. 

Bema or BEMA may also refer to:
Bema (moth), a genus of moth
Bema, Lombardy, a town in the province of Sondrio, Italy
The British Environment and Media Awards
Oromë or Béma, a Vala in Tolkien's mythology
Bema, an Ancient Greek unit of measurement
 The Business Equipment Manufacturers Association, historical name of the Information Technology Industry Council

See also
Białystok-osiedle Bema, a district of the city of Białystok in Poland